Voter (foaled 1894) was a Thoroughbred racehorse bred in England that competed in the United States where his racing success led to his selection as the American Champion Older Male Horse of 1899. When his racing career was over, Voter became an influential sire.

Background
Voter was bred in England by American Foxhall Keene, the son of the very prominent American businessman and major owner and breeder of Thoroughbred horses, James R. Keene. Voter was brought to the United States as a yearling.

Track and World Records
On July 17, 1900, at Brighton Beach Race Course on Coney Island, New York, Voter set a new World Record of 1:38.00 for a mile on dirt.

Among his important stakes wins, Voter was a three-time winner of the Coney Island Handicap with his most important victory coming in the 1897 Metropolitan Handicap.

At stud
When his racing career was over, Voter stood at his owner's Castleton Stud near Lexington, Kentucky. Some of his important offspring include:

 Ballot  (foaled 1904) : twice American Champion Older Male Horse (1908, 1910).  Damsire of 1928 Belmont Stakes winner Vito.  Damsire of Bull Lea, a five-time Leading sire in North America and a four-time Leading broodmare sire in North America, considered "one of the greatest sires in Thoroughbred breeding history."
 Electioneer (foaled 1904) : undefeated at two, won eleven straight including the rich 1906 Futurity Stakes. American Champion Two-Year-Old Colt. Grandsire of Morvich, winner of the 1922 Kentucky Derby. 
 Hilarious (foaled 1906) : won United States Hotel Stakes, Travers Stakes, Withers Stakes, Carlton Stakes, Tidal Stakes.
 The Manager (foaled 1909) : American Horse of the Year and American Champion Three-Year-Old Male Horse in 1912.
 Curiosity (foaled 1908) : dam of Novelty, American Champion Two-Year-Old Colt of 1910.  
 Nightfall (foaled 1908) : dam of Campfire, 1916 American Champion Two-Year-Old Colt.  
 Inaugural (foaled 1910) : dam of Whiskaway, the 1922 American Champion Three-Year-Old Male Horse.

Pedigree

References

1894 racehorse births
Racehorses bred in the United Kingdom
Racehorses trained in the United States
Horse racing track record setters
American Champion racehorses